Bishops Head is an unincorporated community in southern Dorchester County, Maryland, United States.

References

Crabbing communities in Maryland
Populated places in Dorchester County, Maryland
Maryland populated places on the Chesapeake Bay